Mattia Giovanella (born 27 October 1997) is an Italian curler from Cembra, Italy. He currently plays lead on Team Joël Retornaz.

Career
Giovanella and his team of Luca Rizzolli, Alessandro Odorizzi, Giovanni Gottardi and Luca Casagrande represented Italy at the 2019 World Junior-B Curling Championships. There, the team made it to the gold medal game, where they lost to New Zealand's Matthew Neilson. Their second-place finish qualified them for the 2019 World Junior Curling Championships in Liverpool, Nova Scotia. At the championship, they finished in last place with a 1–8 round robin record, only beating Sweden's Daniel Berggren.

Giovanella competed as lead for the Italian National Men's Curling Team skipped by Joël Retornaz at the 2021 World Men's Curling Championship as regular lead Simone Gonin failed to pass the COVID-19 regulations to travel outside the country. At the Worlds, Team Italy finished in seventh place with a 7–6 record, just missing the playoffs.

Personal life
Giovanella works as a stone porphyry maker.

Teams

References

External links

1997 births
Living people
Italian male curlers
Sportspeople from Trento
Curlers at the 2022 Winter Olympics
Olympic curlers of Italy
21st-century Italian people